Matthew "Matt" Borges is an American politician, and the former Chairman of the Ohio Republican Party.

He was honored with the "Distinguished Alumni Award" by The Ohio State University Department of Political Science in 2019. He served on OSU's Advisory Board for the Political Science Department.

Early life and education
Of Portuguese descent, Borges grew up in Barrington, Rhode Island, and earned a B.A. in political science from The Ohio State University in 1994. He is a partner in 17 Consulting, a Columbus, Ohio-based public affairs firm. He and his wife, Kate, live in Bexley, Ohio.

Politics
Borges spent most of his early career working on state and local political campaigns in Ohio.  He ran local campaigns before running Joe Deters successful campaigns for Ohio Treasurer of State in 1998 and 2002.  Borges has worked on several presidential campaigns, and traveled the world as an Advance Representative for the White House from 2001 to 2008. He worked on John McCain's presidential campaign in 2008. In 2010, Borges ran the successful statewide campaign of Dave Yost, who now serves as Ohio Attorney General.  Borges served as Executive Director for the Kasich-Taylor Inaugural Committee in 2011. He is still active in several other campaigns in Ohio.  He is a lifetime member of the McCain Alumni Association, and in 2019 was appointed by Ohio Governor Mike DeWine to the Board of Trustees at Columbus State University.
In February 2020, he was reportedly backing Joe Biden's presidential campaign to undermine the campaign of Bernie Sanders. In June 2020, Borges joined with Anthony Scaramucci and other former Trump and Bush administration officials to launch Right Side PAC, a super PAC encouraging Republicans to vote for Joe Biden over Donald Trump.

Controversies and arrest 
Between 2005 and 2019, Borges was – according to the Dayton Daily News – "embroiled in a dispute over unpaid taxes and liens". According to Borges, he had started to repay approximately $150,000 in state and federal tax arrears by 2013, with the matter being ultimately settled in 2019.

A case against Borges was dismissed by a Cuyahoga County judge in 2009.  Five years earlier, Borges pleaded to one count of a "revolving door" violation, after he refused to testify against former Republican state Treasurer Joe Deters, who he believed had done nothing wrong. He paid a $1,000 fine. Later, the prosecutor who initially tried to bring the case against Deters resigned after failing to act on one of the largest corruption investigations in American history.

On July 21, 2020, Borges, along with Speaker of the Ohio House of Representatives, Larry Householder, and three others were arrested by Federal authorities. They were accused of accepting $60 million in bribes from FirstEnergy in exchange for $1.3 billion worth of benefits in the form of Ohio House Bill 6, which increased electricity rates and provided that money as a $150 million per year bailout for two nuclear plants (Davis–Besse and Perry) owned by FirstEnergy. Borges was found guilty of racketeering.

References

External links
 Ohio GOP
 

American people of Portuguese descent
Living people
Ohio State University College of Arts and Sciences alumni
Ohio Republicans
State political party chairs of Ohio
Year of birth missing (living people)
People from Barrington, Rhode Island
People from Bexley, Ohio